Zenodochium is a genus of moths in the family Blastobasidae.